"Hold On (A Little Longer)" is a song co-written and recorded by American country music artist Steve Wariner.  It was released in October 1988 as the third single from the album I Should Be with You.  The song reached #6 on the Billboard Hot Country Singles & Tracks chart.  The song was written by Wariner and Randy Hart.

Chart performance

Year-end charts

References

1988 singles
1988 songs
Steve Wariner songs
Songs written by Steve Wariner
Song recordings produced by Jimmy Bowen
MCA Records singles